Jared London (born 6 February 1995) is a Trinidadian international footballer who plays for Club Sando, as a midfielder.

Career
He has played club football for Club Sando.

He made his international debut for Trinidad and Tobago in 2017.

References

1995 births
Living people
Trinidad and Tobago footballers
Trinidad and Tobago international footballers
Club Sando F.C. players
Association football midfielders